Julius Ofori (born 3 August 1999) is a Ghanaian professional footballer.

References

External links 
 
 

1999 births
Living people
Ghanaian footballers
Ghanaian expatriate footballers
Expatriate footballers in Belarus
Expatriate footballers in Malaysia
Association football midfielders
Ashanti Gold SC players
FC Energetik-BGU Minsk players
Kelantan United F.C. players